Álvares Machado is a municipality in the state of São Paulo in Brazil. The population is 24,998 (2020 est.) in an area of 348 km².

References

Municipalities in São Paulo (state)